Shoaff is a surname. Notable people with the surname include:

Benny Shoaff (1897–1960), American racing driver
Carrie M. Shoaff (1849–1939), American artist, author, potter, playwright, correspondent
John Earl Shoaff (1916–1965), American entrepreneur and philosopher

See also
 Shoaf